Prattville is a community in Sand Springs, Oklahoma on SH-97.  Prattville is located 10 miles west of Tulsa, and can be found on the south banks of the Arkansas River.

History
In 1945, approximately 4 houses and two small grocery stores were located north of 41st Street and east of Highway 97 in what was known as Garden Heights, now referred to as "old Prattville." Several years later another grocery store and housing addition were built on the west side of Highway 97, forming the nucleus of then-called "Prattville." In October 1962, the Prattville community, consisting of 752 acres owned at one time by Harry Pratt, was annexed by Sand Springs. With the opening of the 41st Street bridge, the building of Keystone Dam and the migrating of Tulsa residents into the area, Prattville experienced phenomenal growth. Several industries once operated on the river near the Highway 97 bridge in an area called Lotsee.  Other communities/towns in and around Prattville include:  Prettywater, Keystone, Berryhill and Limestone. High school students residing in Prattville attend Charles Page High School in Sand Springs; however, Prattville does have Clyde Boyd Middle School and several elementary schools.  Most businesses in Prattville are retail stores along State Highway 97.

Prattville is within the City of Sand Springs; residents are Sand Springs citizens.

Facilities
Prattville Fire Station :
Sand Springs' second fire station was built around 1970 to protect the southern Sand Springs formerly referred to as "Prattville".

Prattville Library
The Tulsa City-County Library System opened the $12,000 Prattville branch on March 23, 1963. Located at 3905 Walnut Creek Drive, it was a 590 ft² trailer-mobile home structure on a concrete foundation housing 7500 library materials in space intended for 5000. For 13 years, during the 21 hours per week that the library was open for service, the residents of Prattville checked out an average of from 3500–5000 items per month and attended storytimes and other events in very cramped space, unless the weather permitted having the programs outside. Librarian Joan McPherson frequently bemoaned having so many children at the after-school storytimes that "she didn't know what to do!" Her problem of limited space for any kind of indoor event intensified when the storytime area was eliminated to make room for more shelves for materials. The only major crisis, however, was a fire discovered by a customer returning books after-hours on Saturday, June 15, 1974. In addition to general smoke damage, the fire caused $1200 worth of damage to the door, floor, light fixtures. Staff and volunteers had to vacuum each individual book to make the collection once again customer-ready.

As the community grew and new schools were opened with students needing more and more library resources, the need for a larger facility became evident and urgent. After some red-tape setbacks and construction halts, the new $100,000, 3100 ft² brick and glass Harry Pratt Library opened in February 1976 at 3219 S. 113 W. Avenue in Sand Springs—no longer called Prattville—complete with a lively red, white and blue decor and the much-demanded 50-person-capacity meeting room for community use. Book capacity increased from the 7500 at the old building to 15,000 in the new facility. In their "move 'em out!" campaign, librarians Joan McPherson and Billye Hopkins utilized a creative method for transferring the paperback books from the old trailer to the new building: they encouraged their customers to check out as many paperbacks as possible before February 12 and then return them to the new library after February 18, thereby eliminating the packing and unpacking procedure.

As services expanded and the community continued to grow, yet another expansion became necessary. Therefore, in May 1991, Pratt Library closed for a $242,000 renovation and increase in size from 3100 to 5890 ft². The community meeting room was enlarged to hold 75 people, a new lobby was added to provide separate access to the library and meeting room, materials capacity was increased to 28,000 items, a new workroom was added for staff, a new bookdrop and book display area were made available to customers, the interior decor became serene teal, and the parking lot was expanded to hold 48 vehicles. Along with the upgrade in size and services, monthly statistics of materials circulation rose from the 5000 at the trailer to approximately 7500 in the new 1976 building to an average of 11,000 in the even larger 1991 building. Meeting room use also grew with such diversified groups as the WOW Stitch Group, Bruner Hill Garden Club, CHEF Literature Club, Happy Endings Book Club, and Oklahoma Driving School taking turns using the room.

Unique to Pratt Library through the years was the Junior Friends of the Library, a group of elementary school students who met once a month for after-school fun with books and projects. Pratt continues to offer a variety of in-house programs for all ages—book discussions, preschool storytimes, computer classes, famous person re-enactments, and workshops for teens on such topics as mask-making, hip-hop, acting, Mendhi. In addition, outreach to local daycares and after-school programs has become a priority as a most worthwhile service to the community.

Geography of Tulsa County, Oklahoma
Unincorporated communities in Oklahoma